The 2001 Wisconsin Badgers football team represented the University of Wisconsin in the 2001 NCAA Division I-A football season.

Schedule

Season summary
After an 8–4 regular season and a Sun Bowl win in 2000, the Badgers looked for their third Rose Bowl trip in 4 years. However, Wisconsin would be defeated in Autzen Stadium by Oregon and Camp Randall by Fresno State.

After those two losses, the Badgers won their next 2 games. But any dreams of Pasadena were dashed after Wisconsin's first Big Ten home game of the season. The Badgers lost 63–32 to Indiana, one of  the worst losses in school history. While they managed to upset a ranked Ohio State team in Ohio Stadium the next week, the Badgers found themselves unable to pull off a significant win after; losing four of their final five to close out the season. While the Badgers managed to keep it close against both Illinois and Michigan, they were unable to pull off an upset of either team, losing another close game to Michigan, 20–17.

Despite a disappointing season, the Badgers had some bright spots. WR Lee Evans had an amazing season, as he would catch 75 passes for 1,545 yards and 9 touchdowns, despite having 3 different QBs during the year (Brooks Bollinger, Jim Sorgi, and Matt Schabert). RB Anthony Davis also turned in an outstanding season, with 1,466 yards rushing Davis would have 10 games of 100 or more yards rushing, including a season high 200 against Penn State.

Despite these great efforts from skill position players, the Badgers had injuries at the QB position, as well as difficulties on defense all season long. The Badgers were 2–3 in games decided by 7 points or less and would lose 7 games on the year, missing the postseason entirely.

Roster

Game summaries

Virginia

#7 Oregon

#19 Fresno State

Penn State

Western Kentucky

Indiana

#21 Ohio State

Illinois

Michigan State

Iowa

#11 Michigan

Minnesota

Regular starters

Team players in the 2002 NFL Draft

References

Wisconsin
Wisconsin Badgers football seasons
Wisconsin Badgers football